The 2016 PSAC Football Championship Game was held on November 12, 2016 at a Hepner–Bailey Field at Adamson Stadium. The two teams from each division (East and West) will played for the PSAC Championship and an automatic bid into the NCAA Division II Football Championship.

Box score

Stats

References

Championship Game
PSAC Football Championship Game
California Vulcans football games
Kutztown Golden Bears football games
PSAC Football Championship Game
PSAC Football Championship Game